The Tomb of Pir Palandouz was built during the Safavid dynasty and is located in Mashhad.

Sources 

جاهای دیدنی مشهد | top-travel.ir
مکان های دیدنی مشهد | toptourist.ir

Mausoleums in Iran
National works of Iran